Ap Lei Pai or Aberdeen Rock is an uninhabited island in Hong Kong, linked to the south of Ap Lei Chau in Hong Kong. It is located between the East Lamma Channel and Aberdeen Channel. It is under the administration of the Southern District.

See also

 List of islands and peninsulas of Hong Kong

External links

Ap Lei Chau
Southern District, Hong Kong
Tidal islands
Tombolos
Uninhabited islands of Hong Kong
Islands of Hong Kong